Sebeșu may refer to one of two places in Sibiu County, Romania:

 Sebeșu de Jos, a village in Turnu Roșu Commune
 Sebeșu de Sus, a village in Racovița Commune

See also 
 Sebeș (disambiguation)